General Sir William Tuyll  (died 26 December 1864) was a British army officer.

Career
Tuyll served as aide-de-camp to Lord Uxbridge during the Peninsular War, and the Walcheren Campaign in 1809. He became lieutenant-colonel on half-pay of the 25th Light Dragoons in February 1812 and colonel of 7th Queen's Own Hussars in March 1846. While still in this position, he died on 26 December 1864.

He fought in India. He was private secretary to the Viceroy of Ireland, and one of the founders of the Oriental Club. He was appointed a Knight Commander of the Royal Guelphic Order and died on 26 December 1864.

References

1864 deaths